Pipp or pipps or variation, may refer to:

Places
Pipp Brook, a tributary of the River Mole in Surrey, England, UK
Pipps Hill, Essex, England, UK; see List of United Kingdom locations: Peo-Pn

People
E.G. Pipp, a U.S. newspaperman, the founding editor of The Dearborn Independent
Frank Pipp (born 1977), U.S. cyclist
Wally Pipp (1893–1965), a U.S. baseball player, a Major League Baseball first baseman best known for being replaced by Lou Gehrig

Fictional characters
Pipp Petals, a character, a Pegasus in My Little Pony: A New Generation
Pipp Wimpley, a character, an alien in the U.S. animated children's TV show Miles from Tomorrowland

Ambrose Pipps, a character from Archie; see List of Archie Comics characters
Amos Pipp, a character from the 1933 U.S. comedy film The Gay Nighties
Mr. Pipp, Mrs. Pipp, Ida Pipp, Julia Pipp; several characters from the 1914 U.S. silent film The Education of Mr. Pipp
Miss Pipps, a character from the 1941 Our Gang comedic short film Come Back, Miss Pipps
Mr. Pipp, a character from the 1968 Soviet children's film Passenger from the "Equator"
Dr. Pipp, a character from the 1925 U.S. comedic short film Circus Fever

Other uses
 Pipp, a cross-translator for converting PHP to Parrot coding
 Pacific Institute of Public Policy (PiPP)
 Premature Infant Pain Profile (PIPP), a pain scale
 PIB5PA (phosphatidylinositol 4,5-bisphosphate 5-phosphatase A) also known as PIPP

See also

 Pipp!n, a multimedia tech platform from Apple
 
 
 
 Pip (disambiguation), including PIPS